Elections for Coventry City Council were held on Thursday, 3 May 2012, the same day as other 2012 local elections in the United Kingdom.  As the council is elected by thirds, one seat in each of the city's 18 wards was up for election. The Labour Party won the seat in 15 of the  wards, gaining a total of 8 and increasing their majority to 32 seats. The Conservative Party won the remaining three seats, losing six, with the Liberal Democrats and the Socialist Party both losing their only seat on the council.

The election coincided with a local referendum on whether to have an elected mayor.

Campaign
The Conservative party focused their efforts on retaining their existing seats, campaigning on issues like the closure of Sure Start centres, disruption caused by rebuilding the city centre, and an alternative budget proposal. Labour focused on their aim of protecting frontline services, rebuilding the city centre for the Olympics (Coventry hosted several football events), and fixing potholes. Liberal Democrat councillor Russell Field focused on his record in working for his ward. The Socialists supported an independent candidate in Foleshill who is campaigning against the planned closure of a local sports centre. They focused on "stiffening the resistance to coalition cuts to this city" and accused Labour of signing up to coalition austerity plans. The Greens focused on alternative plans for the city, including an insulation scheme for homes and instituting a Living Wage for council employees. UKIP was focussing on local issues.

Results
Voter turnout was 26%.

Council composition

The composition of the council before and after the election can be found in the following table:

Results by ward

Note: For all wards, the percentage change is calculated from the council local election in 2011 (the last time the ward was contested), whilst the gains, losses, and holds are calculated from 2008 (the last time these particular seats were contested).

Note for Bablake ward: Independent candidate John Gazey was the sitting councillor for the Conservative party. After being deselected he decided to run as an independent.

References

2012 English local elections
2012
2010s in Coventry